The 2022 WNBA season will be the 25th season for the Minnesota Lynx of the Women's National Basketball Association, and the fourteenth season under Head Coach Cheryl Reeve.

Reeve signed a multi-year contract extension to return as Head Coach in November, while also moving from General Manager to President of Basketball Operations.

The Lynx earned the second overall pick through the 2023 WNBA Draft Lottery. They went into the lottery selection holding the fourth best odds to get the first overall pick, but still moved up two selections.

On November 22, 2022, Natalie Achonwa announced her pregnancy via Instagram.

On December 13, 2022, the Lynx announced Clare Duwelius as the fourth General Manager in franchise history.

The WNBA announced that the first WNBA Canada Game would feature the Chicago Sky and the Lynx on Saturday, May 13, 2023, at Scotiabank Arena in Toronto, ON. This would be the first-ever WNBA preseason game in Canada.

Transactions

WNBA Draft

Transactions

Roster Changes

Additions

Subtractions

Roster

Schedule

Preseason

|- 
| 1
| May 13
| Chicago
| 
| 
| 
| 
| Scotiabank Arena
| 
|-

Regular Season

|- 
| 1
| May 19
| Chicago
| 
| 
| 
| 
| Target Center
| 
|- 
| 2
| May 23
| Atlanta
| 
| 
| 
| 
| Target Center
| 
|- 
| 3
| May 25
| @ Phoenix
| 
| 
| 
| 
| Footprint Center
| 
|- 
| 4
| May 28
| @ Las Vegas
| 
| 
| 
| 
| Michelob Ultra Arena
| 
|- 
| 5
| May 30
| @ Dallas
| 
| 
| 
| 
| College Park Center
| 

|- 
| 6
| June 1
| Connecticut
| 
| 
| 
| 
| Target Center
| 
|- 
| 7
| June 3
| @ Washington
| 
| 
| 
| 
| Entertainment and Sports Arena
| 
|- 
| 8
| June 7
| @ New York
| 
| 
| 
| 
| Barclays Center
| 
|- 
| 9
| June 9
| Indiana
| 
| 
| 
| 
| Target Center
| 
|- 
| 10
| June 11
| Los Angeles
| 
| 
| 
| 
| Target Center
| 
|- 
| 11
| June 16
| @ Los Angeles
| 
| 
| 
| 
| Crypto.com Arena
| 
|- 
| 12
| June 18
| @ Las Vegas
| 
| 
| 
| 
| Michelob Ultra Arena
| 
|- 
| 13
| June 20
| @ Los Angeles
| 
| 
| 
| 
| Crypto.com Arena
|
|- 
| 14
| June 22
| Connecticut
| 
| 
| 
| 
| Target Center
| 
|- 
| 15
| June 27
| Seattle
| 
| 
| 
| 
| Target Center
| 
|- 
| 16
| June 29
| @ Seattle
| 
| 
| 
| 
| Climate Pledge Arena
| 

|- 
| 17
| July 1
| @ Phoenix
| 
| 
| 
| 
| Footprint Center
|
|- 
| 18
| July 5
| Indiana
| 
| 
| 
| 
| Target Center
| 
|- 
| 19
| July 7
| Phoenix
| 
| 
| 
| 
| Target Center
|
|- 
| 20
| July 9
| Las Vegas
| 
| 
| 
| 
| Target Center
|
|- 
| 21
| July 12
| Dallas
| 
| 
| 
| 
| Target Center
|
|- 
| 22
| July 18
| @ Atlanta
| 
| 
| 
| 
| Gateway Center Arena
|
|- 
| 23
| July 20
| Los Angeles
| 
| 
| 
| 
| Target Center
|
|- 
| 24
| July 22
| Las Vegas
| 
| 
| 
| 
| Target Center
|
|- 
| 25
| July 26
| Washington
| 
| 
| 
| 
| Target Center
|
|- 
| 26
| July 30
| @ Connecticut
| 
| 
| 
| 
| Mohegan Sun Arena
|

|- 
| 27
| August 1
| @ Connecticut
| 
| 
| 
| 
| Mohegan Sun Arena
|
|- 
| 28
| August 4
| New York
| 
| 
| 
| 
| Target Center
|
|- 
| 29
| August 8
| @ Chicago
| 
| 
| 
| 
| Wintrust Arena
|
|- 
| 30
| August 10
| @ Indiana
| 
| 
| 
| 
| Gainbridge Fieldhouse
|
|- 
| 31
| August 18
| @ Seattle
| 
| 
| 
| 
| Climate Pledge Arena
|
|- 
| 32
| August 20
| Seattle
| 
| 
| 
| 
| Target Center
|
|- 
| 33
| August 22
| Dallas
| 
| 
| 
| 
| Target Center
|
|- 
| 34
| August 24
| @ Dallas
| 
| 
| 
| 
| College Park Center
|
|- 
| 35
| August 26
| New York
| 
| 
| 
| 
| Target Center
|
|- 
| 36
| August 29
| @ Washington
| 
| 
| 
| 
| Entertainment and Sports Arena
|

|- 
| 37
| September 1
| Atlanta
| 
| 
| 
| 
| Target Center
|
|- 
| 38
| September 3
| Phoenix
| 
| 
| 
| 
| Target Center
|
|- 
| 39
| September 8
| @ Chicago
| 
| 
| 
| 
| Wintrust Arena
|
|- 
| 40
| September 10
| @ Indiana
| 
| 
| 
| 
| Gainbridge Fieldhouse
|
|-

Standings

Statistics

Regular Season

Awards and Honors

References

External links

Minnesota Lynx seasons
Minnesota Lynx
Minnesota Lynx